Mohamed Chrif Tribak (Arabic: محمد الشريف الطريبق; born 1971 in Larache) is a Moroccan filmmaker and screenwriter.

Le temps des camarades, the director's first feature film, was screened at multiple film festivals and won a number of prizes, including the Ousman Samben grand prize at the 2009 Khouribgha African Film Festival and the Grand Prize at the Tangier National Film Festival.

Filmography

Feature films 
 2008: Entre Parentheses
2008: Le temps des camarades
 2015: Petits bonheurs

Short films 
 1998: Nassima
 2003: Balcon Atlantico
 2005: L'Extraterrestre 
 2005: 30 Ans
 2005: Mawal

References

External links 
 

Moroccan film directors
Moroccan screenwriters
1971 births
Living people